Incapachata (possibly from Aymara and Quechua Inka Inca, apachita the place of transit of an important pass in the principal routes of the Andes; a stone cairn, a little pile of rocks built along the trail in the high mountains) is a mountain in the north of the Barroso mountain range in the Andes of southern Peru, about  high. It is situated in the Tacna Region, Tarata Province, Tarata District. It lies northeast of Vilaucarane and south of Antajave.

References

Mountains of Peru
Mountains of Tacna Region